Sharkansky District (Šarkan joros) is an administrative and municipal district (raion), one of the twenty-five in the Udmurt Republic, Russia. It is located in the east of the republic. Its administrative center is the rural locality (a selo) of Sharkan. Population:  21,384 (2002 Census);  The population of Sharkan accounts for 34.6% of the district's total population.

References

Sources

Districts of Udmurtia